Moretus (Moerentorf) is a Flemish family name and may refer to:

Name 
Jan Moretus
Theodorus Moretus
Balthasar I Moretus

Others 
 Moretus (crater) - a crater in the southern hemisphere of the Moon
 Plantin-Moretus Museum

Notes